Alan Joseph Bankman (born 1955) is an American lawyer, currently working as the Ralph M. Parsons Professor of Law and Business at Stanford Law School, and a licensed psychologist.

Education 
Bankman earned a Bachelor of Arts degree from the University of California, Berkeley in 1977 and a Juris Doctor degree from Yale Law School in 1980. He later earned a doctorate in clinical psychology from Palo Alto University.

Career

Bankman is considered a leading scholar in the discipline of tax law and is a compiler of two tax casebooks, including Federal Income Taxation.

Early in his career, he taught at the USC Gould School of Law and practiced with the Los Angeles firm of Tuttle & Taylor.  In 1989, he joined the faculty at Stanford Law School.

Later in his career, he returned to being a student and earned an additional degree in clinical psychology from Palo Alto University, interning with the Counseling and Psychological Services (CAPS) of the University of California, Santa Cruz. At UCSC, he worked as a counselor for first-year law students on handling the anxiety of law school. Bankman also hosted a podcast called WellnessCast for Stanford Law School to discuss "wellness and mental health within the legal profession."

In 2004, he and his colleagues developed a proposal for a California program called ReadyReturn, whereby citizens' income tax returns were filled out in advance, requiring only that the users make corrections.  The program failed to pass the California legislature by one vote, reportedly after lobbying efforts from tax software preparation company Intuit. Bankman spent an estimated $30,000 to $35,000 of his own money on the fight against Intuit.

Following the defeat in California, he continued to advocate for simplification of the U.S. tax filing system and the adoption of return-free filing.

In 2016, he lent his support to Senator Elizabeth Warren's Tax Filing Simplification Act along with 50 other law professors and economists. A letter with Bankman as the lead signatory states, "Much of the time and expense involved in tax filing is unnecessary." He was said to be involved with writing Senator Warren's bill.

He serves as a co-host of the Stanford Legal podcast along with fellow professor Pamela Karlan.

Personal life

Bankman is the husband of Barbara Fried and the father of Sam Bankman-Fried and Gabe Bankman-Fried. He is the brother-in-law of Linda P. Fried.

The couple live in Stanford, California. In the wake of threats to Sam's life, the couple are reportedly spending $10,000 a week for armed security around their home while their son is under house arrest.

FTX 

Bankman's son, Sam Bankman-Fried, has been indicted on multiple felony counts—conspiracy to commit wire fraud, wire fraud, conspiracy to commit commodities fraud, conspiracy to commit securities fraud, conspiracy to commit money laundering, and conspiracy to defraud the Federal Election Commission and commit campaign finance violations—after serving as the founder and former CEO of the FTX cryptocurrency exchange, which collapsed amid allegations of fraud in November 2022.

Bankman was a paid part-time employee of FTX prior to its bankruptcy. He worked for the company for 11 months and focused much of his work on charitable operations.

He also raised funds for the firm before its bankruptcy. Via a connection to his former Stanford Law School student Orlando Bravo, Bankman made an introduction which led to a $125 million investment in FTX from private equity firm Thoma Bravo in June 2021. 
Bankman arrived in the Bahamas as FTX entered bankruptcy. In early November, he called Anthony Scaramucci on behalf of FTX to ask if Scaramucci and SkyBridge Capital could help the company raise billions of dollars to meet customer redemptions.

After his son's indictment, Joseph Bankman has come under scrutiny for his part in the business. In 2017, he interviewed and hired the first lawyers employed by Alameda Research, his son's cryptocurrency trading firm. He reportedly also served as the first attorney for FTX when the exchange was in its nascent stages.

No evidence has emerged linking Joseph Bankman or his wife to any criminal practices. He has hired a lawyer and will not be teaching at Stanford this winter.

Bankman and his wife were signatories to a beachfront residence in Old Fort Bay, Bahamas, that is part of the FTX bankruptcy. A spokesperson for Bankman and his wife said they were trying to return the property to FTX.

References

External links

Stanford Law School faculty
20th-century American lawyers
Living people
American Jews
Place of birth missing (living people)
University of California, Berkeley alumni
Yale Law School alumni
21st-century American lawyers
1955 births